Tattenham Corner is in north Surrey, UK, the name is principally associated with Epsom Racecourse. The railway station of the same name is in the Tattenhams ward of Reigate and Banstead Borough.

Location
Tattenham Corner refers to the sharp bend in the track at the eastern (upper) part of Epsom Racecourse and in its immediate vicinity of Tattenham Corner railway station. The racecourse itself and a short length of road between the station and the course are in the borough of Epsom & Ewell. The local residential area is in Tattenhams ward of Reigate & Banstead.

History
The area is on the northern slope of the North Downs. It was formerly used largely for cattle pasture, sheep farming and wood gathering. By the 1770s, Tattenham Corner was the established name for the top section of the relatively new Epsom Racecourse on Epsom Downs. Between 1850 and 1950 much of the area was built up. The railways arrived in the area.

Emily Davison

On 4 June 1913 Emily Davison obtained two flags bearing the suffragette colours of purple, white and green from the WSPU offices; she then travelled by train to Epsom, Surrey, to attend the Derby. She positioned herself in the infield at Tattenham Corner, the final bend before the home straight. At this point in the race, with some of the horses having passed her, she ducked under the guard rail and ran onto the course; she may have held in her hands one of the suffragette flags. Anmer fell in the collision and partly rolled over his jockey, who had his foot momentarily caught in the stirrup. Davison was knocked to the ground unconscious; some reports say she was kicked in the head by Anmer, but the surgeon who operated on Davison stated that "I could find no trace of her having been kicked by a horse". Bystanders rushed onto the track and attempted to aid Davison and Jones until both were taken to the nearby Epsom Cottage Hospital. Davison was operated on two days later, but she never regained consciousness; while in hospital she received hate mail. She died on 8 June from a fracture at the base of her skull.

Topography of Tattenhams
Tattenhams is a residential area centered on the road Great Tattenhams (B2221). It largely coincides with the Tattenhams ward of Reigate & Banstead Corner. It is  bounded to the south by the Preston Estate, to the south-west by Tadworth, to the west by Walton Downs and Epsom Downs, to the north by Nork and to the east by Banstead. Elevations range between 180 m AOD (above sea level) at its south-east corner and 140 m along most of the northern border. The ward also includes, at its east end and some way from Tattenham Corner, a small area known as Great Burgh, which usually refers only to the former manor site there.

Tattenhams has an established Church of England parish.

Demography and housing: Tattenhams ward

The average level of accommodation in the region composed of detached houses was 28%, the average that was apartments was 22.6%.  

The proportion of households who owned their home outright compares to the regional average of 35.1%.  The proportion who owned their home with a loan compares to the regional average of 32.5%.  The remaining % is made up of rented dwellings (plus a negligible % of households living rent-free).

Homes, mostly split between the three main types of houses with gardens are predominantly of early twentieth-century origin.  The fourth category of homes here, apartments range in date from the late-twentieth to the early twenty-first centuries.

Transport 
Tattenham Corner railway station is where Queen Elizabeth II used to be dropped off by the Royal Train on race days, and is closer to the racecourse than Epsom Downs railway station. There are several bus services going through the area, towards Epsom, Sutton or Redhill. In 1993 it was the site of a train crash, where a driver several times over the then legal drink-drive limit failed to stop the train at the buffers, crashing into the station-hut.

See also
List of places of worship in Reigate and Banstead
Tattenham Corner branch line

Notes

References

Bibliography

External links

Villages in Surrey
Reigate and Banstead
Epsom Downs Racecourse